Mitchell Henry (1826 – 22 November 1910) was an English financier, politician and Member of Parliament (MP) in the House of Commons of the United Kingdom of Great Britain and Ireland. He was MP for  County Galway from 1871 to 1885, and for Glasgow Blackfriars and Hutchesontown from 1885 to 1886.

Biography
Mitchell Henry was the second son of Alexander Henry (1784–1862) of Woodlands, near Manchester, England, a very affluent cotton merchant, founder of A & S Henry & Co Ltd and Member of Parliament for South Lancashire from 1847 to 1852, who was married to Elizabeth, daughter of George Brush of Willowbrook, Killinchy, County Down, and a supporter of the Anti-Corn Law League. Mitchell Henry was educated in London and at University College London where he read for a degree in medicine, eventually becoming a Fellow of the Royal College of Surgeons. He became a senior consultant at the Middlesex Hospital in London by the time he was 30.

After the death of his father in 1862, Mitchell Henry abandoned his career in medicine and returned to his native Manchester to run the family business. He soon became involved in  politics and contested Woodstock for the Liberals in 1865, and stood in the 1867 Manchester by-election, and the 1868 general election, as a moderate Liberal, but was well-beaten in both contests. As part of his candidature in 1868 Henry started up the Manchester Evening News, though it passed out of his hands at the end of the election. He was particularly interested in the cause for a better health provision for the poor.

In 1852, he married Margaret Vaughan (d. 1875) of Quilly House, County Down. He built Kylemore Castle in Connemara Co. Galway between 1863 and 1868. He had nine children, five daughters and four sons. The youngest son Lorenzo Mitchell-Henry became an international pigeon shot and invented the Henrite shot-gun cartridge. He later became a record setting tunny fisherman.

In 1875, his wife Margaret died, aged 45, of a fever contracted in Egypt. After this Mitchell did not spend so much time at Kylemore, although he kept it going. However, he built a beautiful memorial church a short distance from the house on the shore of the lake. Margaret was finally laid to rest nearby in a mausoleum, where in due course he joined her. The church is a miniature replica of a gothic cathedral, the inside features coloured marbles from each of the 4 provinces of Ireland.

In an 1871 by-election he was returned MP for Galway County, and supported Home Rule for Ireland. Having broken with the Irish Parliamentary Party in 1884, in 1885 he was elected Liberal MP for the Blackfriars Division of Glasgow, but defeat the following year when standing as a Liberal Unionist spelt the end of his parliamentary career.

He died in November 1910, at his home in Leamington in Warwickshire.

Arms

References

Further reading

 Kathleen Villiers-Tuthill: "History of Kylemore Castle and Abbey", Kylemore Abbey Publications (30 Sep 2002), ; .

External links
 About Mitchell Henry on the Homepage of Kylemore Abbey & Victorian Walled Gardens, Connemara, County Galway, Ireland;
 Homepage of the Mitchell Henry family
 

1826 births
1910 deaths
Alumni of University College London
Academics of University College London
19th-century English medical doctors
English male journalists
Home Rule League MPs
Irish Parliamentary Party MPs
Members of the Parliament of the United Kingdom for County Galway constituencies (1801–1922)
UK MPs 1868–1874
UK MPs 1874–1880
UK MPs 1880–1885
UK MPs 1885–1886
Members of the Parliament of the United Kingdom for Glasgow constituencies
English newspaper editors
Politicians from Manchester
Politicians from County Galway
Fellows of the Royal College of Surgeons
Scottish Liberal Party MPs
Liberal Unionist Party MPs for Scottish constituencies